Dead wood may refer to:

Dead tree (disambiguation)
 Dead wood, the "straight man" in a double act 
Dead Wood (novel), a 2009 novel by Chris Longmuir
 Dead Wood (film), a 2007 British film

See also
Deadwood (disambiguation)
Wood-decay fungus